Monika Brzostek (born 28 July 1989) is a Polish beach volleyball player. As of 2016, she plays with Kinga Kołosińska. They have qualified for 2016 Summer Olympics in Rio de Janeiro.

References

External links 
 
 
 

1989 births
Living people
Polish beach volleyball players
Women's beach volleyball players
Beach volleyball players at the 2016 Summer Olympics
Olympic beach volleyball players of Poland
People from Rybnik
Sportspeople from Silesian Voivodeship
Universiade medalists in beach volleyball
Universiade silver medalists for Poland
Medalists at the 2013 Summer Universiade